Judith Cloud is an American composer, mezzo-soprano and educator.

Cloud was born in 1954 to a musical family in Reidsville, North Carolina. In an interview, she noted that "the organist at our church imported my whole family to her new town because she wanted us to sing in her choir". She studied at the North Carolina School of the Arts and Florida State University. At the North Carolina School of Arts she studied voice, conducting and composition. Some of her most notable works are "Feet of Jesus" and "Anacreontics" The cantata "Feet of Jesus" is set to poems by Langston Hughes. Cloud's music is built on romantic principles.

Cloud has been a professor of voice at Northern Arizona University in Flagstaff, AZ since 1989.

She was the 2009 winner of the Sorel Medallion in Choral Composition for her piece Anacreontics.

References

21st-century American composers
Living people
Year of birth missing (living people)